Alexander Dmitriyevich Barabanov (born 17 June 1994) is a Russian professional ice hockey player for the  San Jose Sharks of the National Hockey League (NHL).

Playing career
Barabanov made his Kontinental Hockey League debut playing with powerhouse SKA Saint Petersburg during the 2013–14 KHL season. On 7 April 2020, Barabanov having played seven seasons in the KHL with Saint Petersburg, opted to pursue a career in the NHL by signing a one-year entry-level contract with the Toronto Maple Leafs. 

In the pandemic delayed 2020–21 season, Barabanov remained on the Maple Leafs opening night roster and made his NHL debut in a 5–4 overtime win over the Montreal Canadiens on 13 January 2021. Playing in a reduced role, due to the Maple Leafs forward depth, Barabanov appeared sporadically in 13 regular season games collecting 1 point, a primary assist on a T. J. Brodie goal in a 3–2 victory also over the Canadiens, on 7 April 2021. In an assignment to the Maple Leafs AHL affiliate, the Toronto Marlies, Barabanov showed his offensive acumen in collecting 5 points through 2 games.

On 12 April 2021, Barabanov was traded from Toronto at the trade deadline to the San Jose Sharks in exchange for Antti Suomela. He made his debut with the Sharks on 26 April 2021, in a 6–4 win over the Arizona Coyotes, in which he scored his first NHL goal. On 12 May 2021, he signed a one-year extension. 

In the 2022 offseason, he re-signed a two-year, $5 million contract extension with the Sharks.

International play
Barabanov has played for the Russian national team in the World Junior Championships and Senior World Championships. He was a member of the Olympic Athletes from Russia team at the 2018 Winter Olympics.

Career statistics

Regular season and playoffs

International

Awards and honors

References

External links

1994 births
Living people
Expatriate ice hockey players in the United States
Ice hockey players at the 2018 Winter Olympics
Medalists at the 2018 Winter Olympics
Olympic gold medalists for Olympic Athletes from Russia
Olympic ice hockey players of Russia
Olympic medalists in ice hockey
Russian expatriate ice hockey people
Russian expatriate sportspeople in the United States
Russian ice hockey right wingers
San Jose Barracuda players
San Jose Sharks players
SKA-1946 players
SKA-Neva players
SKA Saint Petersburg players
Ice hockey people from Saint Petersburg
Toronto Maple Leafs players
Toronto Marlies players
Undrafted National Hockey League players